Mukhakesa is a genus of fungi in the family Amphisphaeriaceae. This is a monotypic genus, containing the single species Mukhakesa lignicola.

References

External links
Index Fungorum

Xylariales
Monotypic Ascomycota genera